is a former Japanese football player.

Club statistics
Updated to 5 September 2014.

References

External links

1985 births
Living people
Association football people from Hokkaido
Japanese footballers
J1 League players
J2 League players
Japan Football League players
Kashima Antlers players
Montedio Yamagata players
Vegalta Sendai players
FC Ryukyu players
Association football forwards